Ivan Pavlić (born 10 November 2001) is a Dutch footballer who currently plays as a midfielder for Portuguese side Grupo Desportivo Estoril Praia

Club career
Pavlić was born in Rotterdam to Serbian parents, and started his career with Excelsior and Smitshoek, before joining amateur side Spartaan'20. At the age of fourteen, he moved to Belgium to sign for Royal Antwerp. While at Antwerp, he was named twice on the bench in the UEFA Europa League.

After five years in Antwerp, Pavlić failed to agree a new deal, and was allowed to leave the club. He moved abroad again, this time to Portugal, signing with Académica.

International career
Pavlić remains eligible to represent the Netherlands, Belgium and Serbia at international level. He has stated his intention to play for Serbia.

Career statistics

Club

Notes

References

2001 births
Living people
Footballers from Rotterdam
Dutch people of Serbian descent
Dutch people of Belgian descent
Dutch footballers
Association football midfielders
Liga Portugal 2 players
Excelsior Rotterdam players
VV Smitshoek players
Royal Antwerp F.C. players
Associação Académica de Coimbra – O.A.F. players
Dutch expatriate footballers
Dutch expatriate sportspeople in Portugal
Expatriate footballers in Portugal